Wolf Rounds is a musical composition for wind ensemble by the American composer Christopher Rouse. It was commissioned by the University of Miami-Frost Wind Ensemble and its conductor, Gary Green, who premiered the work at Carnegie Hall, New York, on March 29, 2007.  Wolf Rounds was completed in Baltimore, Maryland on October 16, 2006, and lasts approximately seventeen minutes in performance.  It is scored for piccolo, two flutes, three oboes, two clarinets, bass clarinet, two bassoons, contrabassoon, baritone saxophone, bass saxophone, four horns, three trumpets, three trombones, tuba, timpani, percussion (five players), and string bass (amplified).

Wolf Rounds marks the first piece Rouse composed for wind ensemble. Green had previously approached Rouse about a piece for the Wind Ensemble. Rouse initially refused, saying, "I thought I would miss my strings," but later changed his mind. The piece uses a circular motive found throughout, and its original title was Loops. Rouse dismissed the title as bland and prosaic, but the Latin word "lupus" (wolf) came to mind, reminding him of how a wolf, when hunting, circles its prey.  These predatory rounds resemble the circular motive that the piece weaves throughout the ensemble.

Rouse wrote in the program notes to the piece:

References

Compositions by Christopher Rouse
2006 compositions
Concert band pieces
21st-century classical music